This is a list of the Spring 1968 PGA Tour Qualifying School graduates.

The tournament was played over 144 holes at the PGA National Golf Club in Palm Beach Gardens, Florida in late April/early May. There were 81 players in the field and 15 earned their tour card.

Tournament summary 
The medalist was Bob Dickson, winner of 1967 U.S. and British Amateurs. In his third attempt, Mike Hill made it onto the PGA Tour for the first time.

List of graduates 

Sources:

References

1968 1
1968 PGA Tour Qualifying School graduates 1
PGA Tour Qualifying School Graduates
PGA Tour Qualifying School Graduates